Velma is a town in Stephens County, Oklahoma, United States. The population was 620 at the 2010 census.

History
A post office was established at Velma, Indian Territory on September 25, 1886.  It was named for Velma Dobbins, daughter of a local merchant and longtime resident.

At the time of its founding, Velma was located in Pickens County, Chickasaw Nation.

Geography
Velma is located at  (34.452394, -97.668439).

Home of the "Annual Old Settler's Picnic and Rodeo", since statehood has been held on the first weekend of August with few interruptions and is known for attracting the best Calf Ropers in the nation.

Demographics

As of the census of 2000, there were 664 people, 247 households, and 187 families residing in the town. There were 290 housing units at an average density of 205.5 per square mile (79.4/km2). The racial makeup of the town was 90.96% White, 8.28% Native American, 0.30% from other races, and 0.45% from two or more races. Hispanic or Latino of any race were 1.05% of the population.

There were 247 households, out of which 40.5% had children under the age of 18 living with them, 60.3% were married couples living together, 12.1% had a female householder with no husband present, and 23.9% were non-families. 21.5% of all households were made up of individuals, and 10.1% had someone living alone who was 65 years of age or older. The average household size was 2.69 and the average family size was 3.15.

In the town, the population was spread out, with 29.1% under the age of 18, 8.0% from 18 to 24, 28.5% from 25 to 44, 22.3% from 45 to 64, and 12.2% who were 65 years of age or older. The median age was 35 years. For every 100 females, there were 97.0 males. For every 100 females age 18 and over, there were 87.6 males.

The median income for a household in the town was $30,341, and the median income for a family was $34,286. Males had a median income of $32,083 versus $16,136 for females. The per capita income for the town was $12,010. About 16.3% of families and 17.8% of the population were below the poverty line, including 21.7% of those under age 18 and 15.8% of those age 65 or over.

Notable person
Joe Diffie, country singer-songwriter

References

Towns in Stephens County, Oklahoma
Towns in Oklahoma